Riverton (formerly, Moore's Station and Moores) is a small unincorporated community in El Dorado County, California. The ZIP code is 95726. The community is inside area code 530.

The place was on a toll road operated by John M. Moore, and was originally called Moore's Station. A post office operated at Riverton from 1893 to 1898. The community is now registered as California Historical Landmark #705.

References

Unincorporated communities in California
Unincorporated communities in El Dorado County, California
California Historical Landmarks